Phoenix Carriage Works was a carriage builder established in the 1840s in Markham Village and rival to Thomas Speight Wagon Works.

Henry R. Wales
English immigrant Henry R. Wales (1822-1905), who began as a blacksmith and learned the trade (in the United States) which lead to the founding of Phoenix Carriage Works. Besides his business, Wales was a school trustee and magistrate under the Liberal governments of Oliver Mowat and James Whitney. Wales and his wife Elizabeth had 6 children (including daughters Adelaide Emma, Bertha E, Lottie A.), whom lived at Maple Villa, the only reminder of the Wales that remains in Markham today.

Factory
Their factory was located next to 159 Main Street North and ceased making carriages after 1915 with focus on repairing automobiles and ceased altogether in 1923 after death of son-in-law Levi Webber

References

Companies based in Markham, Ontario
Coachbuilders of Canada
History of manufacturing in Ontario
Defunct companies of Ontario
History of Markham, Ontario